Liponysella is a genus of mites in the family Laelapidae.

Species
 Liponysella madagascariensis (Hirst, 1921)

References

Laelapidae